S. Aishwarya is a Carnatic musician, grand daughter of Carnatic vocalist Radha Viswanathan great grand daughter of M. S. Subbulakshmi

Career 

Aishwarya began her first lessons in early age of four under M. S. Subbulakshmi and Radha Viswanathan. She continued learning Carnatic music under her grand mother Radha Viswanathan almost for 18 years who died in 2018

In October 2017, Aishwarya & her sister Saundarya were invited by the Indian Prime Minister  Narendra Modi to sing at his residence  they sang composition "Maithreem Bhajatha" of the Mahaperiaval of Kanchi which was composed for World Peace and sung at the United Nations in 1966 by M. S. Subbulakshmi and Radha Viswanathan.

Aishwarya & her sister Saundarya perform together and the have given many classical music concerts in many prestigious venues across the world.

Awards and recognitions

References

Further reading 

1995 births
Living people
Women Carnatic singers
Carnatic singers
Women musicians from Tamil Nadu
Singers from Chennai
21st-century Indian women singers
21st-century Indian singers